Halil İbrahim Yücel (born November 24, 1989) is a Turkish volleyball player, a member of the club Ziraat Bankası Ankara.

Sporting achievements

Clubs 
Turkish Championship:
  2015
  2013
  2012
Turkish Cup:
  2013
CEV Cup:
  2013

References

External links
 TVF-Web.DataProject profile
 Volleybox profile
 CEV profile

1989 births
Living people
Turkish men's volleyball players
Halkbank volleyball players
Arkas Spor volleyball players
Galatasaray S.K. (men's volleyball) players
Ziraat Bankası volleyball players
21st-century Turkish people